General Wilkins may refer to:

Henry St Clair Wilkins (1828–1896), British East India Company general
John Wilkins Jr. (1761–1816), Allegheny County Militia brigadier general
Michael Wilkins (Royal Marines officer) (1933–1994), Royal Marines lieutenant general
William Walter Wilkins (born 1942), South Carolina National Guard brigadier general